BNJ may refer to:

Bailie Nicol Jarvie whisky, distilled in Scotland.
Bonn Hauptbahnhof station, in Germany, according to the IATA code list of stations
The British Numismatic Journal, an academic journal published by the British Numismatic Society
Brill's New Jacoby, the updated edition with English translation of Fragmente der griechischen Historiker
Hangelar-Bonn airport in Sankt Augustin, Germany, according to the list of IATA airport codes